The Leeds municipal elections were held on Thursday 12 May 1966, with one third of the council up for election.

A 2.7% swing towards Labour allowed the party to defend half of their losses of the previous year, and win a majority of the seats up for election, despite still trailing the Conservatives by a significant number in votes. The three Tory gains were in the marginal wards of Beeston, Bramley and Wortley, adding to the gains they were enjoying around the country.

There was a sharp drop in turnout for the election - falling into the twenties for only the second time in post-war history - to 29.6%. Unlike the nadir of 1960 election, where the fall mostly came from the Labour vote, this year's drop chiefly hit Conservative support. None-the-less, the Labour vote received was close to their worst.

The Liberals managed to regain second place in Far Headingley and Wellington, although standing their lowest number of candidates since 1958 and receiving their lowest share since that year. The Communists' received their greatest share on a reduced vote, from their peak in the prior election and the British National Party participated after a five-year absence, fielding a sole candidate in Armley.

Election result

The result had the following consequences for the total number of seats on the council after the elections:

Ward results

References

1966 English local elections
1966
1960s in Leeds